Owen County is a county in the U.S. state of Indiana. In 1920 the United States Census Bureau calculated the mean center of U.S. population to fall within this county. As of the 2010 United States Census, it had a population of 21,575. Its county seat is Spencer.

Owen County is part of the Bloomington, Indiana, Metropolitan Statistical Area.

History
In 1787, the fledgling United States defined the Northwest Territory, which included the area of present-day Indiana. In 1800, Congress separated Ohio from the Northwest Territory, designating the rest of the land as the Indiana Territory. President Thomas Jefferson chose William Henry Harrison as the territory's first governor, and Vincennes was established as the territorial capital. After the Michigan Territory was separated and the Illinois Territory was formed, Indiana was reduced to its current size and geography. By December 1816 the Indiana Territory was admitted to the Union as a state.

Starting in 1794, Native American titles to Indiana lands were extinguished by usurpation, purchase, or war and treaty. The United States acquired land from the Native Americans in the 1809 treaty of Fort Wayne, and by the treaty of St. Mary's in 1818 considerably more territory became property of the government. This included the future Owen County. White settlers had been moving into the future Owen County area since 1816.

The area in present-day Owen County was first placed under local jurisdiction in 1790, when Knox County was created. This all-encompassing county was repeatedly subdivided as its lands were occupied − in 1816 a portion was partitioned to create Sullivan County, and on 2 February 1818 another area to the south was partitioned to create Daviess County. That same winter (21 December 1818) the state legislature took portions from northern Daviess and eastern Sullivan to create Owen County; it was named for Abraham Owen, a colonel in the US Army who had died at the Battle of Tippecanoe in 1811. The boundaries of this new county were reduced in 1822 when Putnam and in 1825 when Clay counties were created.

The first moves to organize the county's government were completed in 1819. In 1820 the first commissioners selected Spencer, the county's largest settlement, as its seat of government.

In 1920, the United States Census reported Owen County as the Center of Population for the US at a point 8 miles south-southeast of Spencer, Indiana. The center moved the shortest distance since census data collecting began in 1790 (just under 10 miles) from its previous center in Bloomington, Indiana. When the East experienced high rates of growth, as it did in the decades between 1890 and 1920, the Westward movement of the center slowed.

Geography
Owen County's low hills were completely wooded before the nineteenth century. It is still largely tree-covered, but significant portions have been cleared and are dedicated to agriculture or urban use. The White River flows southwestward through the lower central part, entering from Monroe County (its course delineates a portion of the border between Monroe and Owen counties), then continues its journey into Greene County.

Adjacent counties

 Putnam County - north
 Morgan County - northeast
 Monroe County - southeast
 Greene County - south
 Clay County - west

Major highways

  U.S. Route 231
  Indiana State Road 42
  Indiana State Road 43
  Indiana State Road 46
  Indiana State Road 67
  Indiana State Road 157
  Indiana State Road 243
  Indiana State Road 246

Protected areas
 Cataract Falls State Recreation Area
 McCormick's Creek State Park - the state's first park (1916)
 Owen-Putnam State Forest (part)

Towns
 Gosport
 Spencer (county seat)

Unincorporated communities

 Adel
 Alaska
 Alligator
 Arney
 Atkinsonville
 Beamer
 Braysville
 Carp
 Cataract
 Coal City
 Cuba
 Cunot
 Daggett
 Denmark
 Devore
 Farmers
 Freedom
 Freeman
 Hancock Corner
 Hickory Corner
 Highets Corner
 Hubbell
 Jordan
 Lewisville
 Marion Mills
 New Hope
 Patricksburg
 Pottersville
 Quincy
 Romona
 Silex
 Smithville
 Southport
 Stockton
 Vandalia
 Vilas
 Wallace Junction (ghost town)
 Whitehall

Townships

 Clay
 Franklin
 Harrison
 Jackson
 Jefferson
 Jennings
 Lafayette
 Marion
 Montgomery
 Morgan
 Taylor
 Washington
 Wayne

Climate and weather

Government

The county government is a constitutional body, and is granted specific powers by the Constitution of Indiana, and by the Indiana Code.

County Council: The fiscal body of the county government, consisting of seven members. Three are elected county-wide (at-large members) and four are elected from districts. District One includes Harrison, Montgomery, Taylor, and Wayne Townships including the Town of Gosport. District Two includes Washington Township including the Town of Spencer. District Three includes Jackson, Jennings, Lafayette, and Morgan Townships. District Four includes Clay, Franklin, Jefferson, and Marion Townships. All council members serve four-year terms with at-large members elected during Presidential election cycles and district members elected during the other election cycles. One council member serves as president and another as vice-president. The council sets salaries, the annual budget, and special spending. The council has limited authority to impose local taxes, in the form of an income and property tax that is subject to state level approval, excise taxes, and service taxes. Several local boards such as the Alcoholic Beverage Board and Library Board have a member or members appointed by the council.

Board of Commissioners: The executive body of the county; its three members are elected county-wide to four-year terms, however each must reside in their respective districts, two of which are elected during Presidential election cycles and the other during the other election cycles. Each serves a four-year term. The District One member must reside in Harrison, Jackson, Jennings, Montgomery, Taylor, or Wayne Townships. The District Two member must reside in Clay, Franklin, or Washington Townships. The District Three member must reside in Jefferson, Lafayette, Marion, or Morgan Townships. One commissioner serves as president and another as vice-president. Commissioners execute acts legislated by the council, collect revenue, and manage the county government.

Court: The county has a Circuit Court. The judge on the court is elected to a term of six years and must be a member of the Indiana Bar Association.

County Officials: The county has other elected offices, including sheriff, coroner, prosecutor, assessor, auditor, treasurer, recorder, surveyor and clerk of the circuit court. These officers are elected to four-year terms. Members elected to county government positions are required to declare party affiliations and to be residents of the county.

Demographics

2010 census
As of the 2010 United States Census, there were 21,575 people, 8,486 households, and 5,992 families in the county. The racial makeup of the county was 97.9% white, 0.3% Asian, 0.3% American Indian, 0.3% black or African American, 0.2% from other races, and 0.9% from two or more races. Those of Hispanic or Latino origin made up 0.9% of the population. In terms of ancestry, 28.7% were German, 20.7% were Irish, 8.9% were English, and 8.4% were American.

Of the 8,486 households, 31.0% had children under the age of 18 living with them, 56.1% were married couples living together, 9.2% had a female householder with no husband present, 29.4% were non-families, and 24.0% of all households were made up of individuals. The average household size was 2.52 and the average family size was 2.96. The median age was 42.4 years.

The median income for a household in the county was $47,697 and the median income for a family was $52,343. Males had a median income of $40,668 versus $30,556 for females. The per capita income for the county was $20,581. About 9.2% of families and 12.4% of the population were below the poverty line, including 17.8% of those under age 18 and 8.1% of those age 65 or over.<ref"></ref>

See also
 National Register of Historic Places listings in Owen County, Indiana

References

External links
 Owen County Official Website

 
Indiana counties
1819 establishments in Indiana
Populated places established in 1819
Bloomington metropolitan area, Indiana